is a 2003 Japanese drama film written and directed by Kiyoshi Kurosawa, starring Tadanobu Asano, Joe Odagiri and Tatsuya Fuji. It was entered into the 2003 Cannes Film Festival.

Plot 
Yuji Nimura (Joe Odagiri) and Mamoru Arita (Tadanobu Asano) are two factory workers, who are constantly irritated by their boss, Fujiwara (Takashi Sasano). Mamoru entrusts his poisonous jellyfish, which he has been acclimating to fresh water, to Nimura.

Nimura goes to Fujiwara's house one night with the intent of hurting Fujiwara, only to find that Mamoru has already done so. Mamoru is convicted of the murder but commits suicide on death row, leaving Nimura a private message to "go ahead."

Mamoru's divorced father, Shinichiro (Tatsuya Fuji), takes Nimura in. Nimura helps with Shinichiro's electronics salvage business, but is still a loose cannon. He ultimately realizes he must learn to cope with his place in the world, with his responsibilities and his losses, and with the difference between the bright future he dreamed of and the stark reality he finds himself in.

Mamoru's jellyfish escapes its tank and reproduces in the drains of the city (possibly by binary fission, since there is only one). Nimura takes a job at his sister's office and later encounters a gang of youths in Che Guevara T-shirts. He helps the group gain after-hours access to the office, but the police caught all but Nimura.

Nimura and Shinichiro see a huge swarm of jellyfish in a man-made river, making their way out to sea. One of jellyfishes stings Shinichiro, rendering him unconscious. The gang of youths, now released from police custody, wonder what became of Nimura while they walk aimlessly down the street.

Cast
 Joe Odagiri – Yûji Nimura
 Tadanobu Asano – Mamoru Arita
 Tatsuya Fuji – Shinichiro Arita
 Takashi Sasano – Mr. Fujiwara
 Marumi Shiraishi – Mrs. Fujiwara
 Sayuri Oyamada
 Hanawa
 Ryo Kase
 Yoshiyuki Morishita
 Sakichi Sato

Reception
Ed Gonzalez of Slant Magazine gave Bright Future 2 and a half stars out of 4. Manohla Dargis of The New York Times gave the film a favorable review, saying: "One of the pleasures of Mr. Kurosawa's films is how casually he tosses in ideas about contemporary life, the state of the family, the place of technology, all while steadily shredding your nerves." Scott Tobias of The A.V. Club felt that the final tracking shot of the film is mesmerizing.

References

External links
  
 
 
 
 
 Bright Future review  at Nippon Cinema

2003 films
2003 drama films
2000s Japanese-language films
Films directed by Kiyoshi Kurosawa
Japanese drama films
2000s Japanese films